A parvenu is a person who is a relative newcomer to a high-ranking socioeconomic class. The word is borrowed from the French language; it is the past participle of the verb parvenir (to reach, to arrive, to manage to do something).

Origin
The word parvenu typically describes a person who recently ascended the social ladder, especially a nouveau riche or "new money" individual.  The famous Margaret Brown, who survived the sinking of the Titanic in 1912, was portrayed as a "new money" individual, most notably in the "climbing social classes" musical The Unsinkable Molly Brown, because of her impoverished Irish immigrant roots and lack of social pedigree.

The Oxford English Dictionary defines a parvenu as: "A person from a humble background who has rapidly gained wealth or an influential social position; a nouveau riche; an upstart, a social climber. Also in extended use. Generally used with the implication that the person concerned is unsuited to the new social position, esp. through lacking the necessary manners or accomplishments."

The term designates individuals not socially accepted by individuals already established in their new class. It expresses a form of classism.

Social climber
A social climber is a derogatory term that denotes someone who seeks social prominence through aggressive, fawning, or obsequious behavior. The term is sometimes used as synonymous with parvenu, and may be used as an insult, suggesting a poor work ethic or disloyalty to roots.

Examples
Several examples might include athletic and entertainment professionals born and raised in poverty and suddenly finding themselves with significantly higher income due to their new-found celebrity status.

Royalty 
Established royal families of Europe regarded the Bonaparte family as parvenu royalty. Napoleon III tried to marry into Swedish and German royalty, but was unsuccessful because he was a parvenu. For instance, his plan to marry Anna Pavlovna, one of the sisters of the Emperor Alexander, did not push through because the Empress Mother objected to the union on account of Napoleon's status as a parvenu. The reason given for the misalliance was difference of religion.

This was also said to be the case with the marriage of Egyptian Princess Fawzia to the future Shah of Iran, Mohammad Reza Pahlavi. One of the reasons speculated for their divorce is that Fawzia's family, including King Farouk I, viewed the Pahlavis as parvenus. Though the Muhammad Ali dynasty of Egypt and Sudan, to which Fawzia belonged, had humble beginnings, it had solidified its status in Egypt and the Arab World since 1805. In contrast, the Pahlavis were a far more recent dynasty, owing their position entirely to the coup d'état of Mohammad Reza Pahlavi's father, Reza Khan, in 1921.

In the United States 
Many parvenus in the United States arrived there as poor immigrants, then worked their way up the social ladder. Beginning as laborers, they took advantage of better economic opportunities in the U.S., moving on to become civil servants, "white collar" (business/office) workers and finally members of respectable society. Such an example might be John Jacob Astor, whose family once skinned rabbits for a living. With his brother, he went on to build such icons of New York City as the Waldorf-Astoria Hotel. His grandson moved to England, where he eventually became the first Viscount Astor.

In France 
In the 19th century, the French aristocracy viewed Jewish women who converted to Christianity upon marriage as parvenus. Professor Catherine Nicault of the University of Reims Champagne-Ardenne has argued that this exemplified the way in which the French aristocracy was hostile toward Jews.

In literature

 Vanity Fairs Becky Sharp is considered an archetype of the social climber, having flirted her way up the British upper class. The character was not born to affluence or the aristocracy, but climbed the social ladder through opportunism and her personal ambition. 

 In the novel Enigma Otiliei by Romanian writer George Călinescu, Stănică Rațiu represents the newly rich. He obtains his wealth by stealing money from a rich old man and by marrying into the elite.
 In the novel The Great Gatsby, Gatsby represents the newly rich. He obtains his wealth through bootlegging, spends it lavishly, and struggles to gain the acceptance of older money.
 In the novel The Red and the Black, the provincial protagonist Julien Sorel thinks of himself as a parvenu after establishing himself in the service of the Marquis de la Mole.
 In The Cherry Orchard, Gayev regards Lophakhin as a parvenu, as many critics interpret his remarks.
 Pip, from Dickens's Great Expectations, would be considered a parvenu by many.
 Edmond Dantès as The Count of Monte Cristo in Alexandre Dumas' work.
 John and Alisoun in "The Miller's Tale" by Geoffrey Chaucer.
 The Franklin in "The Franklin's Tale" by Geoffrey Chaucer.
 Mrs. Bennet, and the Bingleys, in Jane Austen's novel Pride and Prejudice.
 Philip Elton in Jane Austen's novel Emma.
 Jane Wilson in Anne Brontë's novel The Tenant of Wildfell Hall.
 Barry Lyndon, the protagonist of the novel The Luck of Barry Lyndon by William Makepeace Thackeray.
 The Necklace by Guy de Maupassant tells the story of Madame Mathilde Loisel and her husband. Mathilde always imagined herself in a high social position with wonderful jewels. However, she has nothing and marries a low-paid clerk who tries his best to make her happy.
 "William Wilson", a short story by Edgar Allan Poe.

Philosophy

Friedrich Nietzsche in The Gay Science section 176 on Compassion "les souverains rangent aux parvenus" translated "the sovereign put themselves before the parvenu".

Film and television
 In Miss Potter, Beatrix Potter refers to her parents as "Parvenus...social climbers" after they attempt to prevent her from marrying her publisher Norman Warne since he is a tradesman, despite them coming from a trading background.
 In Downfall, Adolf Hitler furiously accuses Hermann Göring of being a parvenu.
 In The Crown, Queen Mary says Prince Philip "represents a royal family of carpetbaggers and parvenus".
 Hyacinth Bucket, the protagonist of the British sitcom Keeping Up Appearances
 In Stan & Ollie, Stan Laurel calls Hal Roach a parvenu when he refuses to give them a raise.

See also
 Nouveau riche
 Social mobility
 Snobbery
 Hypergamy
 Covetousness
 Novus homo
 Yuppie

References

External links

Class discrimination
French words and phrases
Social classes
Upper class culture
Socio-economic mobility

ja:成金
zh:暴发户